Purity may refer to:

Books
Pureza (novel), a 1937 Brazilian novel by José Lins do Rego
Purity (novel), a 2015 novel by Jonathan Franzen
Purity (TV series), a TV series based on the novel
Purity, a 2012 novel by Jackson Pearce
Purity, a 1998 novel by Shaun Hutson
Purity, a 2007 play by Thomas Bradshaw (playwright)
Cleanness, also known as Purity, a 14th-century poem

Companies
Purity Dairies, a dairy company in Nashville, Tennessee, United States
Purity Factories, a food processing company in St. John's, Newfoundland and Labrador, Canada
Purity Distilling Company, an alcohol manufacturer involved in the Boston Molasses Disaster in the U.S.
Purity FM, a Nigerian radio station
Purity, a former supermarket brand owned by Woolworths Supermarkets (Australia)

Film
Purity (film), a 1916 motion picture
Purity by Anat Zuria
Black oil (The X-Files) (also known as Purity), a fictional alien virus in the TV series The X-Files

Music
"Purity", a 1999 song by Slipknot on their debut self-titled album
Purity (Hate Forest album) (2003)

Places
Purity Mountain, a summit in Canada

Religion
Purity, the absence of vice in human character, synonymous with chastity when used in reference to a person's sexual nature
Ritual purification, a feature of many religions
Purity in Buddhism, a spiritual purity of character or essence

Science
Purity, the absence of impurity or contaminants in a substance; for example, Chemical purity
Purity, the proportion of a named pure substance in a sample (by weight, mass, volume, or count)
Fineness, several units of purity of precious metals
Nine (purity), an informal unit of purity
Purity, the colorfulness of a light source
Purity (quantum mechanics), a measure of correlation between a system and its environment
Purity (algebraic geometry), a lack of unmixed-ness

See also

Blood purity (disambiguation)
Chemical purity
Concentration
Impurity (disambiguation)
Pure (disambiguation)